A conciliation cross, also known as a roadside cross, is a stone cross, which was set up in a place where a murder or accident had happened.

Purpose
In medieval times, they were sometimes handmade by the murderer as a symbol of conciliation with the family of his victim. Conciliation crosses were also put where many accidents, disasters or epidemics had happened.  These memorial crosses are mostly in central and western Europe.

Occurrence in Czechia
In the Czech Republic, an archive of national instances is in the town of Aš alongside some of these; the number of documented Czech crosses is more than 2300.

See also 
 Wayside shrine
 Roadside memorial

Monumental crosses
Crosses by function
Stone crosses